Jaiprakash Associates Limited, commonly known as Jaypee Group, is an Indian conglomerate company based in Noida, Uttar Pradesh, India. It has business interests in engineering, construction, power, cement, real estate, hospitality, IT, sports and education (not-for-profit).

Overview

Manoj Gaur is the elder son of Jaiprakash Gaur. He is the Chairman of the Jaiprakash Associates Limited.
Jaypee is cement producer and the private sector hydropower company with 1,700 MW in operation. The Jaypee Group successfully completed projects in 18 states of India and Bhutan. Jaypee is the engineering and construction company for India's Yamuna Expressway, which opened 9 August 2012.

JIL, the group flagship, has an engineering and construction wing which mostly supports Jaypee projects. It also has the largest land bank in India's National Capital Region, i.e., New Delhi. Jaypee has two thermal power plants (Bina Thermal Power plant – 500 MW and Nigrie Thermal Power Plant – 2X660 MW).

History
Jaiprakash Gaur is the founder and was chairman of Jaiprakash Associates Limited. After acquiring a Diploma in Civil Engineering in 1950 from the now called Indian Institute of Technology Roorkee (IITR) in Roorkee, Uttarakhand, he had a stint with the Government of Uttar Pradesh. Later he became an entrepreneur, started as a civil contractor in 1958. 

 2014 - In August 2014, Shree Cements announced that it is set to acquire Jaiprakash Associates' 1.5 million tonne grinding unit at Panipat for 360 crore. The Jaypee group has been selling most of its cement assets to reduce its debt.
 2015- In September 2015, JSW Energy acquired two hydropower Projects of Jaiprakash Associates in a deal worth   9,700 crore.
2017 - UltraTech Cement completed the Rs 16,189 crore acquisition of Jaiprakash Associates' six integrated cement plants and five grinding units, having a capacity of 21.2 million tonnes.
2019 - Commissioning of 720 MW Hydro project (having 114 M high concrete dam and underground powerhouse having 4x180 MW generators) for Mangdechhu Hydro Electric Power Project Authority in Bhutan.
2022- Dalmia Bharat signed a binding agreement to acquire Jaiprakash Associates’ cement, clinker and power plants at an enterprise value of Rs 5,666 crore.

Controversies 

 In November 2017, the Supreme Court of India barred the directors from selling their personal assets.
 Due to debt, Jaiprakash Associates did not pay back its fixed deposit holders on time.  The National Company Law Tribunal had extended the deadline to 31 March 2017 to settle the same.
 As of 2022, the company had attracted the notice of several US-based mutual funds and ETFs, who reported owning significant positions in the company. Investors in the company include Dimensional Fund Advisors and WisdomTree.

References

External links
 

 
Companies based in Noida
Companies listed on the Bombay Stock Exchange
Indian brands
Indian companies established in 1979
Conglomerate companies established in 1979
1979 establishments in Uttar Pradesh